Video+ (or Video+ Player on Google Play) is a video player and downloader that is developed and operated by LEO Network. The developer describes it as a video "hunter" or "seeker" where to explore one’s interests and discover the neighborhood.

Description 
Video+ works as a sniffer to allow users to discover video collections from nearby people. It was featured on the location-based media sharing and discovering function. Location-based service (LBS) was first applied by the biggest and fastest growing Location-Based Social Network – Foursquare and became popular and widely used to Mobile app since 2009.
Video+ has no registration requirements for the first login, users can share their video list under the “Share” function and discover other users’ lists under “Nearby”. In addition, users may find common-interest groups.

Supported Formats 
mkv, avi, flv, rm, rmvb, asf, asx, mov, mpe, ts, vob, wmv, f4v, vp, mpeg, mpg, m4v, mp4, 3gp, 3gpp, 3g2, 3gpp2

Download Protocols 
Supports BT, HTTP, HTTPS, MAGNETsj

Technologies 
According to Sem, one of LEO’s most contributed developers: Video+ was implemented with the self-developed “Air-Link Multi-connectional Wireless Transmission” technology, which combines Wi-Fi with Bluetooth and requires no internet connection during the downloading process.

References

External links 
Official Site
Video+ on Google Play

Media players
Mobile software